Kremin-2 Kremenchuk is a Ukrainian football team based in Kremenchuk, Ukraine and it serves as a junior team for the FC Kremin Kremenchuk. Like most tributary teams, the best players are sent up to the senior team, meanwhile developing other players for further call-ups.

Competing usually at regional level of Poltava Oblast and occasionally the national amateur competitions, in 2022 it debuted in Ukrainian Second Division.

Among notable achievements it should be noted about 2nd place runner of Poltava Oblast football championship in 2000. Earlier in 1999 the team appeared in competitions among amateurs but placed last in its group. Its next appearance at national level the team has made only in the 2019–20 season as Kremin-Yunior.

League and cup history

{|class="wikitable"
|-bgcolor="#efefef"
! Season
! Div.
! Pos.
! Pl.
! W
! D
! L
! GS
! GA
! P
!Domestic Cup
!colspan=2|Europe
!Notes
|}

Managers

Notes and references

See also
FC Kremin Kremenchuk

FC Kremin Kremenchuk
1999 establishments in Ukraine
Kremin-2 Kremenchuk